The 2012 Stony Brook Seawolves football team represented Stony Brook University in the 2012 NCAA Division I FCS football season as a member of the Big South Conference. The team was coached by Chuck Priore and played its home games at Kenneth P. LaValle Stadium in Stony Brook, New York. This was their final season as a member of the Big South as they will join the Colonial Athletic Association in 2013. They finished the season 10–3, 5–1 in Big South play to share the conference championship with Coastal Carolina and Liberty. They received an at-large bid into the FCS Playoffs, their second straight playoff appearance, where they defeated Villanova in the first round before falling in the second round to Montana State.

Previous season
After starting the season 0-3, Stony Brook went on to win nine games straight clinching an outright Big South Championship  and defeating Albany in the first round of the NCAA Division I Football Championship. Advanced to the second round to face the top seeded Sam Houston State falling 27-34. The Seawolves became the first team in Big South history to finish the season undefeated. The program was ranked #18/#16 in the final Sports Network/Coaches Poll.

Before the season

Losses
Injured QB Michael Coulter who started for half of the 2011 season, top running back Brock Jackolski, WR Matt Brevi who amounted to 31 receptions for 616 yards and seven touchdowns in the 2011 season, CB Donald Porter are among the graduates of the program. Jackolski was notable for playing a crucial role together with Miguel Maysonet in Stony Brook's powerful running offense, 16th in FCS history with 6,394 all-purpose yards

Recruitment
Among 2012 Recruits is Marcus Coker who previously played for FBS Big Ten team Iowa rushing for more than 2,000 yards and 18 touchdown in two seasons. He was second in the Big Ten in rushing and earned second-team all-conference honors. The program also added Adrian Coxson who previously played for FBS Maryland. A third recruit from the Big Ten Minnesota, Leston Simpson, is transferring for the upcoming 2012 season. A second incoming transfer from the University of Maryland, Avery Graham, was announced late April with two years of eligibility left  A third incoming transfer, Graham Ball, was announced from New Mexico Military Institute, where he led the Western States Football League in points (88). He went 58 of 62 on extra points and made 10 field goals, earning second team All-WSFL honors.

Note: This list is incomplete

Spring
Stony Brook scheduled the annual spring game for April 22 concluding the spring training period. The Defensive team defeated the Offense, 39-13, in a modified scoring game.

Honors
In early May Kyle Essington, Miguel Maysonet, and Marcus Coker were announced to be in the CFPA preseason watch list. In late June, 2012 Beyond College Sports Madness selected Miguel Maysonet, Jaware Dudley, and Kyle Essington were selected to Preseason All-America teams. In July, Maysonet was announced to be part of the 20 members Walter Payton Award watch list. The award is presented to the top offensive player in Football Championship Subdivision. Miguel Maysonet was announced to be the Big South 2012 preseason offensive player of the year, while another six players made it to the All-Conference preseason team.

Rankings and polls
Stony Brook was ranked 24th in Lindy’s College Football Preview Magazine FCS Preseason Poll released in mid-July, the only team from the Big South in the poll. College Sporting News ranked Stony Brook as top 16 in the nation in their preseason poll. The Seawolves were ranked nine among FCS teams by the "Phil Steele's College Football Review" magazine. College Sports Madness ranked the Seawolves 22nd in their preseason preview. Stony Brook was positioned 11th in the College Sports Journal Preseason Top-25 Poll.

Stony Brook was selected as the favorite in the Big South's preseason poll, as voted by the league's head coaches and media panel. The Seawolves amounted to fifteen of eighteen first-place votes with 123 total points. Stony Brook was ranked as the top 17 team in the FCS Coaches Poll

Roster

Broadcasting
All games were broadcast on the radio by 90.1 MHz WUSB FM on the Long Island and Southern Connecticut region. An online feed will be available at wusb.fm. In addition, all Seawolves away game were broadcast nationally on ESPN3, the game against Army will be broadcast nationally on CBSN, SNY and TWCS will carry the Syracuse matchup while MASN will carry the matchup against Liberty

Schedule

Game summaries

Central Connecticut

Recap: Stony Brook opened their 2012 season at home for the first time since the 2008 season in front of 6,094 fans against the Central Connecticut Blue Devils resuming the old CCSU-SBU rivalry that existed while Stony Brook participated in the NEC. After a couple of non-scoring exchanges early in the first quarter, Stony Brook capitalized on a failed drive by Central Connecticut ending on the CCSU 4. It was followed by four-yard rush by Marcus Coker to take an early 7-0 lead. After another three-and-done by Central Connecticut the Seawolves responded with a quick offensive drive. Kevin Norrell received an eighty-nine-yard pass from Essington for another touchdown to extend the lead to 14-0 five minutes into the quarter. CCSU followed with a short non-scoring drive resulting in a punt at SBU 16. Stony Brook responded with another strong drive, this time by running back Miguel Maysonet who rushed for 89 yards to put the Seawolves ahead by 20 followed by another successful kick by transfer Graham Ball as the Seawolves took a commanding lead into the second quarter.

Momentum switched in Central Connecticut's favor early in the second quarter as they capitalized on their first drive with a 37-yard field goal. Stony Brook's next drive ended with an interception and CCSU followed by another Central Connecticut touchdown to cut Stony Brook's lead to 21-10. On the very next drive Stony Brook's offense responded with another touchdown with Maysonet receiving a 29-yard pass by Essington to take an 18-point lead into the second half.

The third quarter was all Stony Brook with the dual-punch of Maysonet and Coker accounting for most of the offensive yardage. Stony Brook took a commanding 42-10 lead into the fourth quarter. Both teams traded touchdowns in the fourth quarter resulting in a 49-17 win by Stony Brook opening their season with a victory for the first time since facing Colgate back in 2008's home opener.

A good offensive performance by Stony Brook totaled 489 total yards against CCSU 216 total yardage. The running game accounted for 301 yards with Miguel Maysonet rushing for 171 and Coker for 75 in his first game at Stony Brook. The Seawolves dominated the passing game (171 vs  64) and had better third-down efficiency. Central Connecticut possessed the ball 32:29 of the game.

Coach Priore commented on the game saying “It was a good win in a good atmosphere.  I thought our defense played really fast early on.  Overall, we played our brand of football”. Maysonet commented on the 84-yard run saying “(Mike) Lisi made a nice block, and as I saw the defender coming at me, I leaped over him.  I kind of got tired at the end, but Adrian Coxson helped me into the end zone”. Quarterback Essington also commented on the powerful dual-back system saying “Having guys like Miguel and Marcus (Coker) really relieves a lot of pressure on myself.  We have a lot of returners and playmakers, so my job is to get the ball to them and let them make plays”.

Series: Stony Brook leads 8-3

Pace

Stony Brook rebooted their historical series against Pace, a series last played in 1998 when the Seawolves initiated their transition to Division I. The Seawolves came out strong in front of 4,194 fans at Kenneth P. LaValle Stadium scoring on every drive in the first quarter taking a commanding 28-0 (Wesley Skiffington converting all the PATs) lead into the second quarter with over 179 yards of offense. Stony Brook outmatched their Division II opponent throughout the second quarter scoring on every drive to take a forty-two point lead into the locker room and shutting out Pace's offense for the entire first half.

Despite the heavy rain that poured during the halftime period, the game continued and the Stony Brook offense scored at will throughout the quarter adding twenty-one points to their lead. Both teams exchanged touchdowns in the final quarter for an eventual 77-7 defeat of Division II Pace Setters. Stony Brook extended their series lead to 11-2 against a historical New York metropolitan area rival. Stony Brook amounted to 693 yards of offense (504 rushing yards against 104 from Pace. J.Williams and D.Lawrence led Stony Brook's rushing offense while Maysonet and Coker had limited production in the game.

Coach Priore commented on the game saying “I'm proud of this team's effort and focus this week. We prepared correctly and it showed on the field. We had the opportunity to give kids some playing time”. Davon Lawrence who had expanded roles in the game also added  “The offensive line did a great job of blocking for us tonight. They opened up a lot of holes tonight” while Iowa transfer Marcus Coker commented on the performance of the team adding "Our running attack is good. We have a lot of good running backs on this team. Jamie and Davon were exciting to watch."

Stony Brook improved to 2-0 while Pace fell to 0-2 for the season. Stony Brook holds a ten-game winning streak over Pace.

Series: Stony Brook leads 11-2

Syracuse

Stony Brook traveled upstate to face off against the Division I FBS Syracuse Orange of the Big East Conference, an intrastate matchup. Playing Syracuse for the first time in front of 34,512 fans, Stony Brook was the first one to score, after a 63-yard reception by Kevin Norrell to open up a 7-point lead four minutes into the first quarter. However, the lead didn't lasted long, Syracuse responded quickly with a touchdown of their own after a 61-yard sideline run by Prince-Tyson Gulley. On the next drive, Stony Brook advanced down the field but Syracuse came up with a defensive stop at 3rd & goal forcing the Seawolves to settle for a twenty-yard field goal to take a three-point lead. Neither team was able to capitalize on their following drives as the Seawolves took a 10-7 lead into the second quarter.

After a couple of non-scoring drives by both teams Syracuse scored on a twenty-seven-yard rush by Ashton Broyld to take a 14-10 lead. Stony Brook responded in the very next drive with a 71-yard rush by Miguel Maysonet in which he hurdled pass a Syracuse opponent, the play being one of the top plays in ESPNs flagship program SportsCenter, to regain a 17-14. Neither team scored for the rest of the half as Stony Brook took a three-point lead into the locker room.

Syracuse took the lead for good early in the third quarter on a 13-yard reception by Jarrod West and extended their lead in the fourth quarter with another 19-yard reception by Marcus Sales to hold off the Seawolves by a score of 28-17.

Overall Stony Brook amounted to 311 offensive yards against Syracuse's 549 but the Seawolves rushed for three more yards, 217, than the Orange. The Seawolves had two turnovers in the game in comparison to one by Syracuse and Stony Brook possessed the ball for 30:18. Stony Brook fell to 2-1 while Syracuse won their first game of the season.

Series: Syracuse leads 0-1

Colgate

Stony Brook returned home looking to get their third win of the season after a heartbreaking 17-28 loss to the Syracuse Orange the prior week. They faced off against the Colgate Raiders for the third time in history, in front of a sold out Wolfstock crowd of 10,278, the highest attendance for any sporting event at the University. The Seawolves offense attacked early scoring in their first drive capped by 16-yard run by Marcus Coker to put the Seawolves on board (Skiffington PAT) 7-0. After several non-scoring drives by both teams, Stony Brook capitalized on a 41-yard field goal by Skiffington to take a 10-0 lead into the second quarter.

With the momentum squarely on Stony Brook's favor, the Seawolves continued their offensive raid scoring another touchdown after a 34-yard reception by Jordan Gush (Skiffington PAT) to put the Seawolves up 17-0 two minutes into the quarter. However, the Raiders didn't back down, the Colgate offense responded in the very next drive scoring a touchdown of their own to cut Stony Brook's lead to ten points. After a three-and-out by Stony Brook, Colgate continued its offensive strike and scored a touchdown on a 51-yard reception by Ed Pavalko to cut further into Stony Brook's lead. Stony Brook's offense was unable to respond, and Colgate intercepted Essington's pass in SB30 to regain possession of the football with 1:34 left in the quarter. It was more than enough time for Colgate, as the Raider offense capitalized on the Seawolves turnover with another touchdown to take a 21-17 lead into the locker room.

Entering the third quarter the Seawolves held possession of the football but had to settle for a field goal to cut Colgate's lead to a single point. However, it wasn't long before the Colgate Raiders capitalized on another Seawolves turnover. Chris Horner sacked Essington and Dier recovered the ball for a 14-yard run to regain a 28-20 lead over the Seawolves for the rest of the quarter.

Opening the fourth quarter, the Seawolves scored on their very first drive capped by a 14-yard run by Coker to put the Seawolves back into the game, but failed to get the two-point conversion as the game remained 28-26 on Colgate's favor. Colgate responded with a field goal on their next drive but the Seawolves took the lead for good scoring a touchdown in the follow up drive (Two Point Conversion failed) to get a 32-31 victory, their seventh straight homecoming win.

Head Coach Priore commented on the atmosphere saying "Tonight's atmosphere was a special one. When you have fans that are in the seats during warm-ups, generally, it's going to be a great crowd." and added "The biggest thing was not having a hangover after the Syracuse game. Good teams and good programs have the ability to overcome adversity."
Overall, the Seawolves amounted to a total 427 yard against Colgate's 318. Stony Brook rushed for 272 yards while Maysonet alone rushed for 198, followed by Coker's 68 yards. The Seawolves possessed the ball for 32:22 and turned over the ball three times, highly uncharacteristic of the team. Stony Brook improved to 3-1 while Colgate fell to 1-3.

Series: Stony Brook leads 2-1

Army

Stony Brook traveled to West Point, New York, to face off against their second FBS team of the season, the Army Black Knights, for the first time in history. In front of 31,006 fans Stony Brook wasted no time. The offense struck early in their first drive led by 49-yard scoring drive by Miguel Maysonet (Skiffington PAT) to put the Seawolves up 7–0. Army's next drive ended with a fumble recovered by Stony Brook's Davonte Anderson at SB 31 but the Seawolves weren't able to capitalize as Army returned the favor with a forced fumble on quarterback Kyle Essington recovered by Army. Neither team scored for the rest of the quarter. The Seawolves opened the second quarter with a 27-yard field goal by Skiffington to extend the lead to 10–0. Stony Brook's offense continued to shut down the Army offensive forcing two more Army fumbles at the SB35 and SB 7. Skiffington kicked a 44-yard field goal as the Seawolves took a 13–0 lead into the locker room.

Series: Stony Brook leads, 1–0

Charleston Southern

Stony Brook will open their conference season at home against the Charleston Southern Buccaneers, after defeating the Bucs 50–31 at Charleston the previous year. The Seawolves hold a 3–1 all-time series lead against CSU.

Series: Stony Brook leads 4–1

Coastal Carolina

After facing the Buccaneers, Stony Brook will return to South Carolina to face conference rival Chanticleers. Stony Brook defeated the Chanticleers 42-0 at LaValle Stadium the previous season as the Seawolves will attempt to keep Coastal Carolina win-less in the Series.

Series: Stony Brook leads 5-0

Gardner-Webb

The Seawolves will return home after back to back weeks in South Carolina to face off the Gardner-Webb Runnin' Bulldogs in conference play. Stony Brook defeated the Bulldogs 76-28 at Boilings Springs the previous season and will attempt to defeat Bulldogs for the fourth straight year.

Series: Stony Brook leads 4-1

Presbyterian

Recap:

Series: Stony Brook leads 5 - 0

VMI

Series: Stony Brook leads 5 - 0

Liberty

Stony Brook traveled down to Lynchburg in hopes of gaining their second consecutive outright championship. Stony Brook faced off against Liberty in front of 14,419 fans
Series: 2-3

Villanova (NCAA First Round)

Due to the three-way tie breaker rules in the Big South Conference, the Seawolves were unable to clinch the automatic bid to the NCAA Division I Football Championship, which went to Coastal Carolina by winning all their Big South road games. However, the Seawolves were selected as at-large candidates to enter the playoffs, the first at-large bid ever for any program at the University. Stony Brook put a bid for a playoff home game and was selected to host the Villanova Wildcats, the CAA Automatic qualifier, and a future rival of the Seawolves when Stony Brook enters the CAA in 2013.

Series: Stony Brook leads 1-0

Montana State (NCAA Second Round)

Series: 0-1

Post-season honors

Big South Offensive Player of the Year: Miguel Maysonet

First-team

Offense:

RB - Miguel Maysonet, Sr., Stony Brook
WR - Kevin Norrell, Sr., Stony Brook
OL - Michael Bamiro, R-Jr., Stony Brook
OL - Mike Lisi, Soph., Stony Brook

Defense:

DL - Jonathan Coats, Sr., Stony Brook
LB - Jawara Dudley, Jr., Stony Brook
DB - Dominick Reyes, R-Sr., Stony Brook

Special Teams:

wr - Wesley Skiffington, R-Sr., Stony Brook

Second-Team

Offense:

QB - Kyle Essington, Sr., Stony Brook
OL - Scott Hernandez, R-Jr., Stony Brook

Defense:

DB - Davonte Anderson, Jr., Stony Brook
DB - Cedrick Moore, Sr., Stony Brook

Walter Payton Award

Senior RB Miguel Maysonet was the runner-up candidate for the Walter Payton Award behind Old Dominion sophomore quarterback Taylor Heinicke. The Walter Payton Award is given to the most outstanding player in the Football Championship Subdivision.

FCS rankings

References

Stony Brook
Stony Brook Seawolves football seasons
Big South Conference football champion seasons
Stony Brook
Stony Brook Seawolves football